The 1912–13 season was Chelsea Football Club's eighth competitive season The club finished 18th in the First Division, narrowly avoiding relegation.

Table

References

External links
 1912–13 season at stamford-bridge.com

1912–13
English football clubs 1912–13 season